A Secret Life is a 1999 American drama film directed by Larry Peerce and starring Roma Downey and William Russ. Made for direct release to television by Lifetime Network, it was retitled in the United Kingdom as Breach of Trust.

Plot summary
Mark and Cassie Whitman are a happily married couple. They are proud of their teenage son. They are obviously still in love at their twentieth anniversary party. Mark leaves to go on a business trip; the plane crashes and he is soon reported badly injured but alive. Listed as Mark's wife is a travelling companion of which Cassie knows nothing about. Her husband is in a coma in the hospital. Cassie did not know her husband had a mistress, nor did he know of their eight-year-old daughter Erica. Cassie sets out to find out the truth.

Cast
Roma Downey as Cassie
William Russ as Mark Whitman
Jed Millar as son
Jamie Rose as Judith Evans
Penny Johnson Jerald as Hope
Kristina Malota as Erica

References

External links

1999 television films
1999 films
1999 drama films
Films directed by Larry Peerce
Lifetime (TV network) films
American drama television films
1990s English-language films
1990s American films